Curt C. Silberman (May 23, 1908 – September 9, 2002) was a German-Jewish and American attorney, community leader, and member of Jewish organizations in both Germany and the United States. Born Kurt Leo Silbermann in Würzburg, Germany, he and his wife Else fled due to the rampant antisemitism of the Nazi era and settled in New Jersey. His legal career in the United States focused on restitution work for the victims of the Nazi government.

Silberman was active in many Jewish organizations. He was a co-founder of the Leo Baeck Institute, and for a period of time, the head of American Federation of Jews from Central Europe and a member of the Executive Committee of the Conference on Jewish Material Claims Against Germany.

External links

Guide to the Curt C. Silberman Collection at the Leo Baeck Institute, New York
Oral history interview with Curt Silberman

References

Jewish emigrants from Nazi Germany to the United States
Restitution
20th-century American lawyers
American people of German-Jewish descent
German-Jewish culture in the United States
1908 births
2002 deaths